The Karpovka is a small river of the Neva basin in Saint Petersburg, Russia. It separates Aptekarsky Island (right bank) from Petrogradsky Island (left bank). The Russian name is derived from the old Finnish name of the river, Korpijoki, meaning forested area river. The Saint Petersburg Botanical Garden and Ioannovsky Convent are situated on the right bank of the river.

See also
 List of bridges in Saint Petersburg

External links
Karpovka, river @ Encyclopaedia of Saint Petersburg

Distributaries of the Neva
Rivers of Saint Petersburg